Millfield is a census-designated place in northern Dover Township, Athens County, Ohio, United States. As of the 2010 census it had a population of 341. It has a post office with the ZIP code 45761. It is located near State Route 13 midway between Chauncey and Jacksonville. Route 13 formerly ran through the community, but a bypass relocated it close by.

History
A post office was established at Millfield in 1827. Besides the post office, Millfield had a gristmill.

The Millfield Mine disaster, the worst mine disaster in Ohio history, occurred at Millfield in 1930.

References

Braxton Nelson (born october 2009) (age 12) currently lives in this town.

Census-designated places in Ohio
Census-designated places in Athens County, Ohio
Coal towns in Ohio
1827 establishments in Ohio
Populated places established in 1827